The Inchagiri Sampradaya, also known as Nimbargi Sampradaya, is a lineage of Hindu Navnath and Lingayat teachers from Maharashtra which was started by Bhausaheb Maharaj. It is inspired by Sant Mat teachers as Namdev, Raidas and Kabir. The Inchagiri Sampradaya has become well known throughout the western world due to the popularity of Nisargadatta Maharaj.

History

Navnath

Dattatreya
The mythological origins of the Inchagiri Sampradaya are ascribed to Adiguru Shri Dattatreya. He initiated the Navanaths, the Holy Nine Gurus, and the Navanath Sampraday.

Revananath – Siddhagiri Math (Kaneri Math)

One of those Navnaths was Revanath, the 7th or 8th Navnath. Revanath settled on the Siddhgiri hill for ascetic practice, living on whatever the jungle, gave him. He became famous as Kaadhsiddheshwar, "the one who attained supreme realization in a forest".

Revananath is considered to have established the Kaadsiddheshwar temple and math, also called Kaadsiddheshwar Peeth. in the 7th century CE. Other accounts mention a history of "more than 1300 years", and the 14th century CE, when a Lingayat Priest established a Shivling at the hill, which became Kaneri Math, nowadays called Siddhagiri Math,  It is located on Siddhagiri hill in Kanheri village, Karveer tehsil, Kolhapur district, Maharashtra state, India.

The Siddhagiri Math was established around the Moola-Kaadsiddheswar Shiva temple in the Shaiva-Lingayat tradition. It is a vast campus with the central Shiva temple.

In the 12th century the Math came under the influence of Basaveshwar, who established the Lingayat tradition of south India. It is the main Kuldaivat of the Lingayat Shaiva community, its influence exceeding to most of the districts of Maharashtra and Karnataka, and also to some places in Madhya Pradesh and Andhra Pradesh.

Part of Siddhagiri Math is the "Siddhagiri Gramjivan Museum", a wax museum dedicated to Gandhi's ideal of rural life. It was established by the 27th Mathadhipati, Adrushya Kadsiddheshwar Swami Ji.

Dnyaneshwar

Revanath initiated Sant Dnyaneshwar (1275–1296), also known as Sant Jñāneshwar or Jñanadeva and as Kadasiddha or Kad-Siddheshwar Maharaj.

Dnyaneshwar was a 13th-century Maharashtrian Hindu saint (Sant – a title by which he is often referred), poet, philosopher and yogi of the Nath tradition whose works Bhavartha Deepika (a commentary on Bhagavad Gita, popularly known as "Dnyaneshwari"), and Amrutanubhav are considered to be milestones in Marathi literature.

According to Shirvaikar, Dnyaneshwar was initiated into the Nath by his older brother Nivrutti, who was born in 1273. 

In 1287 Nivrutti initiated his younger brother:

Dnyaneshwar died at the young age of 21.

Nimbargi Maharaj (Gurulingajangam Maharaj) – Nimbargi Sampradaya
Different accounts of the founding of the Nimbargi Sampradaya by Nimbargi Maharaj, the alternate name of the Inchegeri Sampradaya, are to be found.
 According to several accounts, in 1820 Kadasiddha, or "Almighty "Kadsiddeshwar", appeared as a vision to Sri Gurulingajangam Maharaj" (1789-1875), also known as "Nimbargi Maharaj". 
 According to a different account, the 22nd or 24th Shri Samarth Muppin Kaadsiddheswar Maharaj initiated Nimbargi Maharaj.
 According to Frydman, Kadasiddha initiated both Lingajangam Maharaj and Bhausahib Maharaj, and "entrusted to their care his Ashram".
 According to Cathy Boucher, Nimbargi Maharaj's guru was called "Guru Juangam Maharaj". She also mentions "a yogi [at Siddhagiri] who gave [Nimabargi Maharaj] a mantra and told him to meditate regularly on it".

Nimbargi belonged to a Nellawai sub-caste of the Lingayat caste. According to Boucher,

Nimbargi practiced for 36 years, meanwhile living as a householder, and was finally awakened when he was 67. Until his death, at the age of 95, he "initiated people and lived the life of a Jivanmukta".

Bhausaheb Maharaj – Inchagiri Sampradaya

According to Kotnis, Bhausaheb Maharj was looked upon as the reincarnation of Sant Tukaram (1577–1650), a prominent Varkari Sant and spiritual poet of the Bhakti, who had taken birth again in the Neelwani Lingayat community to finish his work of spreading the knowledge of Self-realization. Bhausaheb Maharaj belonged to the Deshastha Brahmin caste. the same caste to which the thirteenth century Varkari saint and philosopher Dnyaneshwar belonged, the 16th century sant Eknath, and the 17th century saint and spiritual poet Samarth Ramdas.

At the request of Nimbargi, Bhausaheb Maharaj Deshpande (1843 Umdi – 1914 Inchgiri) received mantra initiation from Shri Raghunathpriya Sadhu Maharaj, who was an ardent follower and a devoted disciple of Shri Gurulingajangam Maharaj. Bhausaheb Maharaj became a disciple of Nimbargi Maharaj.

Bhausaheb Maharaj teachings were collected  in a book called Nama-Yoga, a term coined by the compilers and translators of the book, whereas Bhausaheb Maharaj himself called it Jnana Marga, just like Nimbargi Maharaj did. Bhausaheb Maharaj's teachings, and those of his student Gurudeo Ranade, have been called Pipilika Marg , "the Ant's way", the way of meditation, while the teachings of Siddharameshwar Maharaj and his disciples Nisargadatta Maharaj and Ranjit Maharaj have been called Vihangam Marg, "the Bird's Way", the direct path to Self-discovery.

After his awakening he was authorized by Nimbargi to carry on the lineage, and established the Inchegeri Sampraday. Sri Bhausaheb Maharaj had many students, among which were:
 Sri Amburao Maharaj of Jigjivani (1857 Jigajevani – 1933 Inchgiri) 
 Sri Ramachandrarao Maharaj (1873 Horti – 1937 Kupakaddi)
 Sri Gurudev Ranade of Nimbal 
 Girimalleshwar Maharaj 
 Sri Siddharameshwar Maharaj (1875–1936)

R.D. Ranade

Ramachandra Dattatreya Ranade (1886–1957) was a scholar with an academic career. He taught at Willindon College, Sangli, on a regular basis before being invited to join Allahabad University as Head of Department of Philosophy where he rose to be the Vice-Chancellor. After retirement in 1946 he lived in an ashrama in a small village, Nimbal, near Solapur where he died on 6 June 1957.

Siddharameshwar Maharaj

Siddharameshwar Maharaj was born in 1888. In 1906 he was initiated by his guru Bhausaheb Maharaj in Inchegeri in Bijapur district, Karnataka India, who taught mantra-meditation as the way to reach Final Reality. In 1920 Siddharameshwar Maharaj started to set out on "the Bird's Path", the fast way to attain realisation, six years after Bhauhaseb maharaj had died. His fellow-students opposed, but eventually he succeeded by himself.

Sri Siddharameshwar Maharaj initiated several well-known teachers:
 Sri Ranjit Maharaj; 
 Sri Nisargadatta Maharaj (1897–1981), who was with him for about two and a half years, 1933–1936;

Siddharameshwar Maharaje used four books to give sermons on: Dasbodh of Saint Shri Samarth Ramdas; the Yoga Vasistha; "Sadachara" of Shri Shankaracharya; and the "Eknathi Bhagwat" of Sant Eknath.

Nisargadatta Maharaj

Nisargadatta started to give initiations in 1951, after a personal revelation from his guru, Siddharameshwar Maharaj:

Nisargadatta Maharaj attracted a broad following in the western world. He never appointed any successor, because 

Only a few persons were acknowledged as jnani by Sri Nisargadatta. Nevertheless, several western teachers regard Sri Nisargadatta to be their guru. Shri Ramakant Maharaj says to be "the only Indian direct disciple of Shri Nisargadatta Maharaj" who offers initiation into this lineage. He received the Naam mantra in 1962 from Shri Nisargadatta Maharaj, and spent the next 19 years with him.

Ranjit Maharaj

Sri Ranjit Maharaj (1913–2000) met Siddharameshwar Maharaj in 1924. The following year he was initiated by Siddharameshwar Maharaj. In 1934, at the age of 24, he took initiation to monkhood. Only in 1983, at the age of 70, initiated his first disciple, Shri Siddharameshwar Maharajs granddaughter in law.

Ganapatrao Maharaj Kannur

Shri Samartha Sadaguru Ganapatrao Maharaj Kannur (1909–2004) was initiated by Siddharameshwar Maharaj when he was thirteen. After graduation he attained liberation at age 24. Later in life he founded the Shanti Kuteer Ashram.

Shri Muppin Kaadsiddheshwar Maharaj

Shri Muppin Kaadsiddheshwar Maharaj was formally adopted by the 25th Virupaksha Kaadeshwar of the Kaneri Math, Lingayat Parampara, and invested as the 26th Mathadheepati of the (Siddhagiri) Kaneri Math, Lingayat Parampara, in 1922 at the age of 17. He met Siddharameshwar Maharaj in 1935, who became his guru.

Lineage and succession

Nisargadatta narrates the following about the succession of teachers of the Inchagiri Sampradaya:

Nisargadatta also told:

Nisargadatta also explained:

Nisargadatta further explains:

Nisargadatta started to give initiations in 1951, after a "personal revelation" from his guru, Siddharameshwar Maharaj, while Ranjit Maharaj started to give initiations in 1983, almost half a century after his awakening, on request of Siddharameshwar Maharaj granddaughter-in-law:

See also
 Avadhuta
 Lingayat
 Basava
 Maharashtra
 Hindu denominations

Notes

References

Sources

Published sources

Web-sources

Further reading

Teachings
 
 
 
 
 
 
 
 
 
Background

External links

General
List of important personalities of Nimbargi Sampradaya
Academy of Comparative Philosophy and Religion
Homepages
Gurudev R.D Ranade homepage 
Sadguru, Sri Ranjit Maharaj homepage & Interview with Sri Ranjit
ShantiKuteer, Shree Samarth Sadguru Ganapatrao Maharaj Kannur homepage
Nisarga Datta Maharaj homepage
Ramakant Maharaj, "a direct disciple" of Nisargadatta
Shri Muppin Kaadsiddheswar Maharaj homepage
Sri Ramakant Maharaj and Inchegiri Navnath Sadgurus Telegram channel

 
Hindu denominations
Hinduism in Maharashtra
Advaita
Shaivism
Bijapur district, Karnataka